Armand A. Roy (born January 16, 1958) was a Canadian politician. He served in the Legislative Assembly of Saskatchewan from 1991 to 1995, as a NDP member for the constituency of Kinistino.

Electoral history

|-
 
|style="width: 130px"|NDP
|Armand Roy
|align="right"|4,298
|align="right"|50.32%
|align="right"|+3.12
 
|Progressive Conservative
|Joe Saxinger
|align="right"|2,918
|align="right"|34.16%
|align="right"|-14.95

|- bgcolor="white"
!align="left" colspan=3|Total
!align="right"|8,542
!align="right"|100.00%
!align="right"|

References

Saskatchewan New Democratic Party MLAs
1958 births
Living people
Fransaskois people